Abu al-Hasan al-Hashimi al-Qurashi, born Nour Karim al-Mutni (died 15 October 2022), was an Iraqi militant and the third caliph of the Islamic State. He was named as caliph on 10 March 2022, in an audio message by the new spokesperson of IS, Abu Omar al-Muhajir, whose announcement came more than a month after the death of his predecessor Abu Ibrahim al-Hashimi al-Qurashi. The message said that Abu al-Hassan was given a pledge of allegiance in response to the will of the former caliph. The Turkish government claimed that he was arrested in Istanbul on 26 May 2022. Later, Islamic State sources denied news reports of his arrest in the 347th issue of their weekly newsletter Al-Naba. In November 2022, Islamic State spokesman Abu Omar al-Muhajir announced that Abu al-Hasan had been killed in combat. After confirmation by the Islamic State and the United States Central Command of his death in Syria, Abu Omar announced Abu al-Hussein al-Husseini al-Qurashi as Abu al-Hasan's successor.

Identity 
Abu al-Hasan was his kunya. Al-Hashimi and al-Qurashi indicate that he belonged to the Banu Hashim clan of the Quraysh tribe.
Al Ain News reported in March 2022 that al-Qurashi's real name was Zaid, an Iraqi national and the former emir of the Diwan of Education. A May 2022 United Nations Security Council (UNSC) report expanded on this, claiming that the most likely candidate as to his real identity was an Iraqi national by the name of Bashar Khattab Ghazal al-Sumaida'i, also known as Haji Zaid, stating:

Abu al-Hassan's identity is not yet established but has been much discussed among Member States, with Iraqi national Bashar Khattab Ghazal al-Sumaida'i cited as the most likely candidate. Some Member States suggested that al-Sumaida'i was arrested in Turkey near Istanbul in May; others maintain that he remains at large. IS has not yet commented.

Turkish president Recep Tayyip Erdoğan corroborated this after his arrest, claiming that al-Sumaida'i had been acting as the highest figure in the Islamic State since the death of former caliph Abu Ibrahim al-Hashimi al-Qurashi. IS, however, have never named their caliph to be al-Sumaida'i, and denied that he was imprisoned.

There are also other theories as to his identity. According to two unnamed Iraqi security officials, al-Qurashi's real name was Juma Awad al-Badri, and he was the elder brother of former IS leader Abu Bakr al-Baghdadi. Research by Iraqi historian Hisham al-Hashimi published in 2020 stated that al-Badri was head of the five-member Shura Council.

It was reported by IS-linked sources that Abu al-Hasan was actually Islamic State leader Abdur Rahman al-Iraqi (Sayf Baghdad), born in Rawa, Iraq and killed in mid-October 2022 in the city of Jasim in Daraa Governorate, Syria. Later on, it was revealed that the  real birth name of Abu Al-Hassan/Abdur Rahman Iraqi was Nour Karim Al-Mutni and he belonged to the Bu Obaid tribe in Anbar.

Biography 
Abu Al-Hassan Al-Hashimi was born Nour Karim Al-Mutni and belonged to the Bu Obaid tribe in Anbar. Some additional details about his life stated that in 2005, his brother and seven of his relatives were kidnapped and killed by the Shiite militia "Wolf Brigade" in Adhamiya, Baghdad. He fought United States forces during the Iraqi insurgency and was imprisoned at some point. According to Iraqi intelligence, he joined AQI in 2005 and operated in Baqubah city, Diyala. During 2014, Abul Hassan worked as an Islamic State operative in Baghdad city in Iraq and in al-Bukamal city in Syria. Some of his relatives work in Al-Rawi Financial Network, subject to US sanctions. Also his brother Firas is detained in Idlib by Hayat Tahrir al-Sham. By 2018, he use to work under Abu Salem Al-Iraqi (IS leader of Damascus in Yarmouk). In May of same year, he left the Yarmouk camp and moved to Southern Syria where he was appointed Governor of Hawran region. During his tenure, Islamic State second leader Abdullah Qardash choose him to be his successor. In 2022, he arrived from Iraq to Daraa province and started working under aliases of Abdur Rahman al-Iraqi and Sayf Baghdad where he headed IS cells that were involved in killing of reconcicled rebel leaders. He ordered execution of prominent rebel leader Sheikh Abu al-Baraa who refused to accept his authority. On 14 August 2022, "reconciled" rebels in Tafas were able to apprehend a Syrian member of the IS shura council whose confessions indicated prominent IS leaders, including Abu Abdul Rahman al-Iraqi (who turned out to be the "Caliph") are present in Jassem. It is said that that the intelligence from this arrested shura member eventually led to demise of Abul Hassan. In December, it was reported that the body of Abu Al-Hassan has been handed over to the US by reconcicled rebels.

A pro IS media group created a tribute video on reign of Abu Al-Hassan Al-Hashimi and claimed that 1547 military operations were carried in his tenure as supreme leader of the Islamic State.

Alleged arrest 
On 26 May 2022, informed sources told Sky News Arabia that Abu al-Hasan had been arrested in Istanbul, and that security forces had reported the arrest to Erdoğan, who was expected to announce the news about the suspect. Turkish state-run Anadolu Agency later claimed that Turkish intelligence had been tracking his movements in Syria for a long period of time, and arrested him promptly after he illegally entered Turkey. In July, a UN Security Council report stated that there was no available clarification regarding the Turkish claim. On 16 September 2022, Islamic State spokesperson Abu Umar al-Muhajir seemingly denied claims that their caliph had been arrested, calling on Muslims globally to pledge allegiance to him.

Death 
On 30 November 2022, the Islamic State announced that Abu al-Hasan had been killed while fighting. The spokesman of IS, Abu Omar, confirmed the news that same day. The United States Central Command confirmed that Abu al-Hassan killed himself by detonating a suicide vest during an operation carried out by former Free Syrian Army rebels which had aligned with government forces in Daraa Governorate in mid-October.

Succession 

He was replaced by Abu al-Huasyn Al-Husayni as the fourth Caliph of the Islamic State.

Explanatory notes

References

2022 deaths
20th-century births
21st-century caliphs
Leaders of Islamic terror groups
Islamist suicide bombers
Islamic State of Iraq and the Levant members from Iraq
Salafi jihadists
People from Al Anbar Governorate
Year of birth missing